Centropogon sodiroanus is a species of plant in the family Campanulaceae.

Ecology
It is endemic to Ecuador where it is known by twelve subpopulations. It has three isolated subpopulations occur in Carchi, El Oro and Morona-Santiago.  Its natural habitat is subtropical or tropical moist montane forests. It is threatened by habitat loss.

References

External links
 Catalogue of Life

Flora of Ecuador
sodiroanus
Near threatened plants
Taxonomy articles created by Polbot